Prue is a town in southern Osage County, Oklahoma, United States. The population was 465 at the 2010 census, up 7.4 percent from the figure of 433 recorded in 2000. The town was named for Henry Prue, who owned the original townsite. Prue was relocated when Lake Keystone was built, and is sometimes called "New Prue".

History
Prue was a small settlement when the Missouri, Kansas and Oklahoma Railroad (later the Missouri–Kansas–Texas Railroad, often called the MKT or "Katy") extended its line from Wybark (near Muskogee) to Osage via Prue in 1902–03. The Prue post office was established in September 1905, and town lots were sold at public auction beginning on March 22, 1911.

Oil exploration around Prue began circa 1911, and the Prue Field was opened east-northeast of town in 1920, becoming a major source of natural gas. The nearby East Osage City and Twin Creek oil fields have continued producing into the twenty-first century.

Keystone Dam construction began in 1956. By the time of completion in 1964, the lake covered 90 percent of the original town. Railroad service to Prue ended in 1964.

Geography
Prue is located at  (36.249730, -96.267403). Prue lies on the Arkansas River arm of Lake Keystone.

Prue is designated as "New Prue" because the original town is now under Lake Keystone, created when the Keystone Dam was completed in 1964.

Demographics

As of the census of 2000, there were 433 people, 169 households, and 128 families residing in the town. There were 196 housing units at an average density of 431.7 per square mile (168.2/km2). The racial makeup of the town was 86.61% White, 0.23% African American, 6.24% Native American, 0.23% Asian, and 6.70% from two or more races. Hispanic or Latino of any race were 0.69% of the population.

There were 169 households, out of which 35.5% had children under the age of 18 living with them, 61.5% were married couples living together, 13.0% had a female householder with no husband present, and 23.7% were non-families. 20.7% of all households were made up of individuals, and 11.2% had someone living alone who was 65 years of age or older. The average household size was 2.56 and the average family size was 2.91.

In the town, the population was spread out, with 26.3% under the age of 18, 8.8% from 18 to 24, 27.5% from 25 to 44, 22.2% from 45 to 64, and 15.2% who were 65 years of age or older. The median age was 36 years. For every 100 females, there were 100.5 males. For every 100 females age 18 and over, there were 95.7 males.

The median income for a household in the town was $26,696, and the median income for a family was $32,917. Males had a median income of $26,667 versus $20,833 for females. The per capita income for the town was $13,335. About 9.4% of families and 14.0% of the population were below the poverty line, including 21.7% of those under age 18 and 10.4% of those age 65 or over.

References

External links
 Prue Schools

Towns in Osage County, Oklahoma
Towns in Oklahoma
Populated places established in 1905
1905 establishments in Oklahoma Territory